Chan Hao-ching and Wu Fang-hsien defeated Wang Xinyu and Zhu Lin in the final, 6–1, 7–6(8–6) to win the doubles tennis title at the 2023 Thailand Open.

Arina Rodionova and Storm Hunter were the reigning champions from 2020, when the event was last held, but they chose not to participate this year.

Seeds

Draw

Draw

References

Main draw

Thailand Open - Doubles
 in women's tennis